I Wanna Know may refer to:

 "I Wanna Know" (Ai song)
 "I Wanna Know" (Alesso song), 2016
 "I Wanna Know" (Joe song)
 "I Wanna Know" (NOTD song)
 "I Wanna Know" (RL Grime song)

See also
 I Don't Want to Know (disambiguation)